Das Album ("The Album") is a collaborative studio album by German singers Thomas Anders and Florian Silbereisen. It was released by Telamo Musik on 5 June 2020 in German-speaking Europe. Produced by Anders' longtime contributor Christian Geller, the album peaked at number-one in Austria, Germany, and Switzerland.

Track listing
All tracks produced by Christian Geller.

Charts

Weekly charts

Year-end charts

Certifications

Release history

References

Thomas Anders albums
2020 albums
Vocal duet albums
Collaborative albums